The Grumman F11F/F-11 Tiger is a supersonic, single-seat carrier-based United States Navy fighter aircraft in operation during the 1950s and 1960s. Originally designated the F11F Tiger in April 1955 under the pre-1962 Navy designation system, it was redesignated as F-11 Tiger under the 1962 United States Tri-Service aircraft designation system.

The F11F/F-11 was used by the Blue Angels flight team from 1957–1969. Grumman Aircraft Corporation made 200 Tigers, with the last aircraft being delivered to the U.S. Navy on 23 January 1959.

Design and development

The F11F (F-11) Tiger origins can be traced back to a privately funded 1952 Grumman concept to modernize the F9F-6/7 Cougar by implementing the area rule and other advances. This Grumman company project was named G-98, and when it was concluded it was a complete design departure from the Cougar.

The design's potential for supersonic performance and reduced transonic drag stirred interest in the U.S. Navy. By 1953, redesigns led to a completely new aircraft bearing no more than a familial resemblance to the Cougar. The new wing had full-span leading edge slats and trailing edge flaps with roll control achieved using spoilers rather than traditional ailerons. For storage on aircraft carriers, the F-11 Tiger's wings manually folded downwards. Anticipating supersonic performance, the tailplane was all-moving. The aircraft was designed for the Wright J65 turbojet, a license-built version of the Armstrong Siddeley Sapphire.

The U.S. Navy Bureau of Aeronautics was sufficiently impressed to order two prototypes, designated XF9F-8 even though the new fighter was clearly a new design. To add to the confusion, the prototypes were then redesignated XF9F-9 with the XF9F-8 designation going to another more straightforward Cougar derivative. Since the afterburning version of the J65 was not ready, the first prototype flew on 30 July 1954 with a non-afterburning engine. In spite of this, the aircraft nearly reached Mach 1 in its maiden flight. The second prototype, equipped with the afterburning engine, became the second supersonic U.S. Navy aircraft, the first being the Douglas F4D Skyray. In April 1955, the aircraft received the new designation F11F-1 (F-11A after adoption of the unified Tri-Service naming system in 1962).

The F-11 Tiger is noted for being the first jet aircraft to shoot itself down. On 21 September 1956, during a test-firing of its 20 mm (0.79 in) cannons, pilot Tom Attridge fired two bursts midway through a shallow dive. As the trajectory of the cannon rounds decayed, they ultimately crossed paths with the Tiger as it continued its descent, disabling it and forcing Attridge to crash-land the aircraft; he survived.

In addition to the F-11A (F11F-1) fighter, Grumman also proposed a more advanced version of the airframe known as the F11F-1F Super Tiger. This was the result of a 1955 study to fit the new General Electric J79 engine into the F11F-1 airframe.

Operational history

Seven U.S. Navy squadrons flew the F11F-1: VF-21 and VF-33 in the Atlantic Fleet and VA-156 (redesignated VF-111 in January 1959), VF-24 (redesignated VF-211 in March 1959), VF-51, VF-121, and VF-191 in the Pacific Fleet.

The F11F's career lasted only four years because its performance was inferior to the Vought F-8 Crusader and the J65 engine proved unreliable. Also, the range and endurance of the Tiger was found to be inadequate. Thus, the Navy cancelled all orders for the F11F-1P reconnaissance version and only 199 F11F-1 (F-11A) fighters were built.

The aircraft was withdrawn from carrier operations by 1961. It continued in service, however, in the Naval Air Training Command in south Texas at NAS Chase Field and NAS Kingsville, until the late 1960s. Students performed advanced jet training in the TF-9J Cougar, and upon completing that syllabus, were given a brief taste of supersonic capability with the F-11 before transitioning to fleet fighters.

While the F-11's fighter career was short, the Blue Angels performed in the aircraft from 1957–1968, when the Tiger was replaced by the McDonnell Douglas F-4 Phantom II.

Prior to the 1962 code unification, the fighter was known as the F11F; after unification, it was redesignated F-11.

In 1973, two former Blue Angels F-11As were taken from storage at Davis-Monthan AFB and modified by Grumman as testbeds to evaluate in-flight thrust control systems. BuNo 141853 was fitted with a Rohr Industries thrust reverser and BuNo 141824 was kept in standard configuration as a chase plane. Tests of the inflight thrust reversal were carried out by Grumman at Calverton beginning in March 1974 and continued at NATC Patuxent River, Maryland until 1975. Following the completion of these tests, both planes were returned to storage at Davis Monthan AFB. These were the last Tigers to fly.

Variants

YF9F-9 Original designation.
F11F-1 Single-seat fighter version for the U.S. Navy, redesignated F-11A in 1962. 199 built and later production aircraft had a longer nose. One was used for static tests with a further production of 231 aircraft cancelled.
F11F-1P Designation of a Navy photo reconnaissance version, 85 were cancelled.
F11F-1F Super Tiger (G-98J) F11F-1 fitted with the J79-GE-3A engine, two built.
F11F-1T Proposed tandem-seat trainer variant; unbuilt.

Operators

United States Navy
VF-21, Atlantic Fleet
VF-24, Pacific Fleet
VF-33, Atlantic Fleet
VF-51, Pacific Fleet
VF-121, Pacific Fleet
VA-156, Pacific Fleet
VF-191, Pacific Fleet
ATU-203 (redesignated VT-23)
ATU-223 (redesignated VT-26)
Blue Angels (1957–1969)

Aircraft on display
F11F-1

138619 - Stricklands Surplus in Wilmington, North Carolina.
138645 – NAF El Centro in Imperial County, California.
141735 – Yanks Air Museum in Chino, California.
141783 – MAPS Air Museum in Canton, Ohio.
141790 – Grissom Air Museum at Grissom Air Reserve Base near Peru, Indiana.
141802 – Lawson Creek Park in New Bern, North Carolina.
141811 – Combat Air Museum in Topeka, Kansas.
141824 – Pima Air & Space Museum in Tucson, Arizona.
141828 – National Museum of Naval Aviation at Naval Air Station Pensacola, Florida.
141832 – Cradle of Aviation Museum in Garden City, New York.
141851 – NAES Lakehurst, New Jersey.
141853 – Pueblo Weisbrod Aircraft Museum in Pueblo, Colorado.
141859 – Veteran's Memorial Park in Tishomingo, Oklahoma.
141864 – NAS Oceana Air Park, Virginia.
141868 – Planes of Fame Air Museum in Valle, Arizona.
141872 – Air Zoo in Kalamazoo, Michigan.
141882 – Valiant Air Command Warbird Museum in Titusville, Florida.                           
141869 – Discovery Park of America in Union City, Tennessee.

Specifications (F11F-1/F-11A)

See also

References

Notes

Bibliography

Andrade, John. U.S. Military Aircraft Designations and Serials since 1909. Hinckley, Leicestershire, UK: Midland Counties Publications, 1979. .
Bowers, Peter M. United States Navy Aircraft since 1911. Annapolis, Maryland: Naval Institute Press, 1990, pp. 183–185. .
Buttler, Tony. American Secret Projects: Fighters & Interceptors 1945–1978. Hinckley, Leicestershire, UK: Midland Publishing, 2008, First edition 2007. . 
Crosby, Francis. Fighter Aircraft. London: Lorenz Books, 2002. .
Gunston, Bill. Fighters of the Fifties. North Branch, Minnesota: Specialty Press, 1981. .
NAVAIR 00-110AF11-1: Standard Aircraft Characteristics, Navy Model F-11A Aircraft. Pax River, Maryland: Naval Air Systems, United States Navy Command.
Spick, Mike. "The Iron Tigers". Air International, Vol. 40 No. 6, June 1991, pp. 313–320. ISSN 0306-5634.
Thruelsen, Richard. The Grumman Story. Westport, Connecticut: Praeger Publishers, Inc., 1976. .

External links

USNavy BuNo. 141811 on display at Combat Air Museum
Artifacts from Blue Angels F-11 crash found fifty years later
US Navy Standard Aircraft Characteristics pamphlet for F-11A (F11F-1) Tiger

F-011 Tiger
Grumman F-11
Single-engined jet aircraft
Grumman F11F
Mid-wing aircraft
Aircraft first flown in 1954
Second-generation jet fighters